The Young Foundation is a non-profit, non-governmental organisation based in London that specialises in social innovation to tackle structural inequality.

It is named after Michael Young, the British sociologist and social activist who created over 60 organisations including the Open University, Which?, Economic and Social Research Council, the School for Social Entrepreneurs, and Language Line.

History

The Institute of Community Studies (ICS) was set up by Michael Young in 1953. The ICS is a research institute which combined academic research and practical social innovation. In 2005, it merged with the Mutual Aid Centre and was renamed The Young Foundation, in honour of its founder, Michael Young. In both current and previous incarnations, The Young Foundation has been instrumental in leading research, driving public debate, and implementing social innovation in the UK and abroad, with an emphasis on combining research and practical application.

During the second half of the 20th century Michael Young was one of the world’s most creative and influential social thinkers and doers. After 1945 he helped shape the UK’s new welfare state. In the early 1950s he set up the Institute of Community Studies and used it as a base for research and action.

Together with collaborators including Peter Willmott, Peter Townsend and many others, he wrote a series of bestsellers which changed attitudes to a host of social issues, including urban planning (leading the movement away from tower blocks), education (leading thinking about how to radically widen access) and poverty.

Young pioneered ideas of public and consumer empowerment both in private markets and in public services, some of which are only now becoming mainstream (for example NHS Direct, the spread of after-school clubs and neighbourhood councils can all be traced to his work). One of his books coined the term ‘meritocracy’. Another radically rethought the role of the family.

Young's greatest legacy was institution building. He initiated, and in some cases directly created, dozens of new institutions including: Open University, Which?, International Alert, University of the Third Age, Economic and Social Research Council, National Extension College, National Consumer Council, Open College of the Arts and School for Social Entrepreneurs.   It was the commercial sale  of Language Line to a venture capital company that provided most of the funding for the establishment of the School for Social Entrepreneurs.

Other organisations Young created pioneered new approaches to funerals and baby-naming, neighbourhood democracy and the arts. He was described by Harvard’s Daniel Bell as ‘the world’s most successful entrepreneur of social enterprises’.

Program 
The Youth Foundation is involved in different areas. These include health and well-being, place-based work, inequality and support for young people.

Notable former employees 

 Michael Young
 Peter Hall
 Geoff Mulgan
 Rushanara Ali
 Charlotte Leslie
 Peter Townsend
 Yvonne Roberts
 Peter Willmott
 Ann Cartwright
 Karen Dunnell

See also
Michael Young, Baron Young of Dartington
List of UK think tanks

References

External links 
 Young Foundation

Non-profit organisations based in the United Kingdom
Political and economic research foundations
Innovation organizations
Research and development in the United Kingdom